Fredrik Bajer (21 April 1837 – 22 January 1922) was a Danish writer, teacher, and pacifist politician who received the Nobel Peace Prize in 1908 together with Klas Pontus Arnoldson.

Life
He was son of a clergyman born in Næstved in 1837. Bajer served as an officer in the Danish army, fighting in the 1864 war against Prussia and Austria where he was promoted to the rank of first lieutenant. He was discharged in 1865, and moved to Copenhagen where he became a teacher, translator and writer.

He entered the Danish Parliament in 1872 as a member of Folketinget and held a seat there for the following 23 years. As a member of parliament, he worked for the use of international arbitration to solve conflicts among nations, and it is due to Bajer's efforts that foreign relations became part of the work of the Danish Parliament and that Denmark participated in the Inter-Parliamentary Union from the beginning and earned a distinguished position among its members.

He supported the early women's suffrage organisation and many peace organizations including International Peace Bureau, both inside Denmark and Europe-wide, and he helped guide the passage of a bill to reach arbitration agreements with Sweden and Norway.

Quotation
"Always we must bear in mind that law has to be substituted for power, that care must be taken to serve the interests of law."

References

External links
 

1837 births
1922 deaths
Danish male writers
Danish Nobel laureates
Nobel Peace Prize laureates
Inter-Parliamentary Union
People from Næstved Municipality
Members of the Folketing 1872–1873
Members of the Folketing 1873–1876
Members of the Folketing 1876–1879
Members of the Folketing 1879–1881 (May)
Members of the Folketing 1881 (May)–1881 (Jul)
Members of the Folketing 1881 (Jul)–1884
Members of the Folketing 1884–1887
Members of the Folketing 1887–1890
Members of the Folketing 1890–1892
Members of the Folketing 1892–1895